Jimmy DeGrasso (born March 16, 1963) is an American heavy metal drummer.

DeGrasso played with Mama's Boys and Lita Ford before eventually working with Y&T and Megadeth and as a session or touring musician for Ozzy Osbourne (1986), White Lion (1991), Fiona (1992), Suicidal Tendencies (1992–1995), MD.45 (1996), and Alice Cooper (1995–1997).

After his dismissal from Megadeth around 2002, DeGrasso worked with Dave Ellefson's F5 (2007–2010) and toured with The David Lee Roth Band (2006), Ministry (2008), Alice Cooper (2008), Hail (2009), Dokken (2012), and Ratt (2014). He also was the drummer of Black Star Riders from December 2012 until March 2017.

Early life and education
DeGrasso was born March 16, 1963, in Bethlehem, Pennsylvania, in the Lehigh Valley region of eastern Pennsylvania. He graduated from Liberty High School in Bethlehem in 1981, where he was a member of Liberty High School's Grenadier Band.

Career

1986 to 1995: Ozzy Osbourne, Y&T, White Lion, and MD.45

DeGrasso originally auditioned for Ozzy Osbourne and played on the demos of The Ultimate Sin before Ozzy and Bob Daisley had a fallout and Ozzy chose to replace the entire band except for Jake E. Lee. DeGrasso then joined the veteran metal band Y&T in 1986, replacing their original drummer Leonard Haze. He remained with the group into the 1990s. In 1991, he briefly filled in as White Lion's touring drummer when Greg D'Angelo left the band.  He went on to play on Megadeth's Dave Mustaine's side project band, MD.45, in 1995.

1998 to 2002: Megadeth
In 1998, Mustaine asked him to join Megadeth as drummer and continue the band's Cryptic Writings tour. He was asked to play with Megadeth five days before the next show. He walked around with a walkman all day to memorize the songs. DeGrasso recorded and toured behind Megadeth's Risk album in 1999–2000, The World Needs a Hero in 2000–2001, and was featured on Megadeth's first ever live CD and DVD release, Rude Awakening, which was released in 2002.

2002 to 2008: Stone Sour, Ronnie Montrose, David Lee Roth Band, and Ministry
DeGrasso has performed at the Modern Drummer Festival in 2002, Ultimate Drummers Weekend in Australia, Drummer Live in the United Kingdom, and toured with Stone Sour (Slipknot vocalist Corey Taylor's side project), and with guitar legend Ronnie Montrose. DeGrasso played with The David Lee Roth Band in 2006 and joined Ministry on their 2008 tour.

2008 to 2012: Alice Cooper Band, F5, and Dokken
In late 2008, DeGrasso came back to Alice Cooper's band to fill in for Eric Singer while Singer played a few KISS shows in the U.S. DeGrasso has also been the full-time drummer for heavy metal band F5 and Hail (along with ex-Megadeth bassist David Ellefson). In summer 2012, DeGrasso toured with Dokken, filling in for Mick Brown, who left Dokken to tour with Ted Nugent.

2012 to 2017: Black Star Riders
In December 2012, DeGrasso joined Thin Lizzy's spin-off band, Black Star Riders, and appeared on Black Star Riders' first album All Hell Breaks Loose, which was released in May 2013.

2014 to 2017: Ratt
In early 2014, DeGrasso filled in for Bobby Blotzer in Ratt and played with them on the Monsters of Rock cruise. DeGrasso is the first drummer to have filled in for Blotzer, since he joined the band in 1982. He filled in for Blotzer again on the Monsters of Rock Cruise in October 2016 before becoming the band's official touring drummer in 2017. He left Ratt in June 2017

Personal life
DeGrasso currently resides in San Jose, California, where he used to own and manage his own drum shop, San Jose Pro Drum, which has now closed.

Bands as drummer 
 Mama's Boys  (1985–1986)
 Y&T  (1987–1991, 1995–1997)
 White Lion  (1991)
 Fiona  (1992)
 Suicidal Tendencies  (1992–1995)
 Alice Cooper  (1994–1998, 2008–2010)
 Megadeth  (1998–2002)
 O'2L  (2006)
 David Lee Roth  (2006)
 Ministry  (2008)
 Dokken  (2012–2013)
 Ratt  (2014, 2016–2018)
 Black Star Riders (2012–2017)

Discography 
1987 Y&T – Contagious
1990 Y&T – Ten
1991 Y&T – Yesterday & Today Live
1992 Fiona – Squeeze
1994 Suicidal Tendencies – Suicidal for Life
1995 Y&T – Musically Incorrect
1996 MD.45 – The Craving
1997 Alice Cooper Band – A Fistful of Alice
1997 Y&T – Endangered Species
1998 Dave Meniketti – On The Blue Side
1998 A.N.I.M.A.L. – Poder Latino (session drummer)
1999 Megadeth – Risk
2000 Megadeth – Capitol Punishment: The Megadeth Years
2001 Megadeth – The World Needs a Hero
2002 Megadeth – Rude Awakening
2002 Megadeth – Still, Alive... and Well?
2006 Megadeth – Arsenal of Megadeth
2006 Sex Machineguns – Made In USA (session drummer)
2007 Megadeth – Warchest
2008 F5 – The Reckoning
2008 Megadeth – Anthology: Set the World Afire
2010 Alice Cooper – Theatre of Death, Live at Hammersmith 2009
2011 The Worshyp – Evil Abounds (session drummer)
2011 Alice Cooper –  Welcome 2 My Nightmare
2012 Dokken – Broken Bones
2013 Black Star Riders – All Hell Breaks Loose
2015 Black Star Riders – The Killer Instinct
2017 Black Star Riders – Heavy Fire

References

External links 

Jimmy DeGrasso at Drummerworld
Jimmy DeGrasso interview at Backstage Pass

1963 births
Living people
20th-century American drummers
20th-century American male musicians
21st-century American drummers
21st-century American male musicians
Alice Cooper (band) members
American heavy metal drummers
American people of Italian descent
Black Star Riders members
Liberty High School (Bethlehem, Pennsylvania) alumni
MD.45 members
Megadeth members
Ministry (band) members
Musicians from Pennsylvania
People from Bethlehem, Pennsylvania
Suicidal Tendencies members
White Lion members